Mark Berger (born January 3, 1954) is a Canadian judoka. A winner of the gold medal in the Men's Heavyweight Judo event at the 1983 Pan American Games and the bronze medal at the 1984 Summer Olympics, he was inducted into the Manitoba Sports Hall of Fame in 1994. He was born in Ukraine and became a Canadian citizen in the late 1970s. He won gold medals in the heavyweight division in the 1981 Maccabiah Games and the 1985 Maccabiah Games in Israel.

Judo career
Berger immigrated to Canada from Ukraine stopping first Vienna, Austria waiting for the visa to go through in 1977. His Canadian career in Judo took off in 1978 when he won a gold medal in the Western Canada Summer Games.

National titles
He won the Canadian national title in 1980, 1981, 1983, 1984, and 1986.

World Championships
He finished 6th in the World Championships in 1981, and 5th in 1984.

Maccabiah Games
Berger, who is Jewish, won gold medals in the heavyweight division in the 1981 Maccabiah Games (in wrestling, and a silver medal in judo) and the 1985 Maccabiah Games in Israel, and also competed for Canada in judo in the 1997 Maccabiah Games.

Commonwealth Games
In 1986, he won the silver medal in the +95 kg weight category at the judo demonstration sport event as part of the 1986 Commonwealth Games.

Pan American Games
Berger won a gold medal at the 1983 Pan American Games, and was voted the province's Athlete of the Year.

Olympics
In 1984 at the Los Angeles Olympics, he earned a bronze medal in judo in the heavyweight division.  He defeated Radomir Kovacevic of Yugoslavia to win the bronze medal.

Hall of Fame
He was inducted in 1994 into the Manitoba Sports Hall of Fame.

In 1996 he was inducted into the Judo Canada Hall of Fame.

Miscellaneous
Berger is currently a coach in Canada.
Berger coached both the men's and women's judo teams at the Maccabiah Games in 2001.
He is also an international referee.
Berger holds a 7th degree black belt in Judo, as well as 3-time Master of Sport ranking in Wrestling, and has placed 2nd in the World Sambo Championships.
Berger is currently teaching in Ralph Brown School as a gym teacher. Has since retired from teaching at Ralph Brown school.

See also
 Judo in Manitoba
 Judo in Canada
 List of Canadian judoka
 List of prominent Jewish judoka

References

External links
Official website
Jews in Sports bio

1954 births
Living people
Olympic bronze medalists for Canada
Canadian male judoka
Competitors at the 1981 Maccabiah Games
Competitors at the 1985 Maccabiah Games
Competitors at the 1997 Maccabiah Games
Olympic judoka of Canada
Judoka at the 1984 Summer Olympics
Jewish martial artists
Jewish Canadian sportspeople
Maccabiah Games medalists in judo
Maccabiah Games gold medalists for Canada
Medalists at the 1984 Summer Olympics
Naturalized citizens of Canada
Olympic medalists in judo
Sportspeople from Winnipeg
Manitoba Sports Hall of Fame inductees
Ukrainian emigrants to Canada
Ukrainian Jews
Pan American Games gold medalists for Canada
Pan American Games medalists in judo
Judoka at the 1983 Pan American Games
Medalists at the 1983 Pan American Games